Stephanie Emma Forrester (born 30 April 1969) is a British triathlete from Aberdeen.

Forrester competed at the first Olympic triathlon at the 2000 Summer Olympics. She took 15th place with a total time of 2:03:56.11. That same year, Forrester took first place at the 2000 ITU Duathlon World Championships in Calais, France.

Following her athletic career, Forrester joined Loughborough University's Sports Technology Institute, where she is a Reader in Sports Engineering and Biomechanics.

References

1969 births
Living people
British female triathletes
Scottish female triathletes
Triathletes at the 2000 Summer Olympics
Olympic triathletes of Great Britain
Duathletes
Sportspeople from Aberdeen